Financial mismanagement is management that, deliberately or not, is handled in a way that can be characterized as "wrong, bad, careless, inefficient or incompetent" and that will reflect negatively upon the financial standing of a business or individual. There are many ways of how financial mismanagement is carried out. For example, the wrong distribution of responsibility, to be remiss with payments, bills and taxes and neglecting responsibility, financial problems and economical standing can cause great financial mismanagement and further on devastate your economy. By looking to various cases where the financial management has gone wrong we will be able to comprehend the effect financial mismanagement can have and how crucial it is for an economy's success to carry out well working financial management.

History
Financial management has always been key to a successful business, and is crucial for an economy to function. There are not only companies and individuals that have economies that rely on financial management but also entire societies and countries.

Examples
Throughout the years there have been infinite companies, persons and also countries that have been declared bankrupt, caused by financial mismanagement. By taking a look at some of the world's largest economies we can find cases where the financial management has somehow gone wrong and will depict how severe the effect of financial mismanagement can actually lead out to be. 
 Argentina, with its many natural resources, well-educated workforce and export-oriented agricultural sector, is today Latin America's third largest economy, but the Argentine economy has been through quite a few ups and downs. In 2001 this led to a severe recession and ever-increasing poverty. The country's increasing public debt was one of the reasons for the recession.
 By the end of 2009 Greece experienced one of the most severe economical collapses in today's society. The crisis had severe results and for instance resulted in great public poverty. In Athens, 20 per cent of the shops were all of a sudden completely empty and in February 2012 it was reported that 20,000 Greeks, during the proceeding year had been made destitute. By years of unrestrained governmental spending, cheap lending and a failing try at implementing financial reforms Greece was left badly off when the global economical crisis struck and the country had loans they were completely unable to repay.
In 2008 the company Lehman Brothers filed for bankruptcy, after being the fourth largest investment bank in the U.S at the time. By lending severe amounts to fund the company's investing for example housing-related assets, made the financial services firm extremely exposed to the financial downturn and subprime crisis.
There are numerous examples of where finances are not managed right and where companies, individuals and even countries are liquidated, and even more examples where there has been episodes of financial mismanagement but the situation was still able to be escaped.

Prevention
Financial mismanagement will always be a possible problem, for businesses, individuals and also entire countries. 
To prevent personal financial mismanagement it is important to have financial education from an early age. 
For a business to succeed in their finances it is crucial to employ people with the right qualifications and experiences and to continuously appraise the financial state within the business. See .

References

External links
They Meant Well : Government Project Disasters

Corporate governance
Corporate finance
Financial management